John Hayden may refer to:

Jack Hayden (baseball) (1880–1942), American baseball player
Jack Hayden (politician) (born c. 1950), Canadian politician
John Hayden (ice hockey) (born 1995), American ice hockey player
John Hayden (Medal of Honor) (1863–1934), American sailor and Medal of Honor recipient
John Louis Hayden (1866–1936), American brigadier general
John Hayden (NASCAR) in 2006 NASCAR Busch Series
John Michael Hayden (born 1984), American soccer player and coach
John Patrick Hayden (1863–1954), Irish nationalist politician and MP
John Hayden (bishop) (born 1940), British retired Anglican bishop
Mike Hayden (John Michael Hayden, born 1944), American politician, Governor of Kansas
John Hayden Jr. (born 1962), New Police Commissioner of the Metropolitan Police Department, City of St. Louis
John Hayden (priest) (1794–1855), Anglican priest